John Henry Pope,  (December 19, 1819 – April 1, 1889) was a Canadian farmer, lumberman, railway entrepreneur, and politician.

Born in Eaton Township, Lower Canada (now Quebec), the son of John Pope and Sophia Laberee, he served with the local militia during the Lower Canada Rebellion of 1837 and opposed those who supported annexation of Eastern Townships to the United States.

He represented Compton County in the Legislative Assembly of the Province of Canada from 1857 to 1867 and was elected to the 1st Canadian Parliament in 1867 representing the riding of Compton  as a member of the Liberal-Conservative Party. He was the Minister of Agriculture and the Minister of Railways and Canals. He served until his death in 1889. His son, Rufus Henry, took his seat after his death.

Electoral history 

By-election:  On Mr. Pope's appointment as Minister of Agriculture, 25 October 1871

By-election: On Mr. Pope's appointment as Minister of Agriculture, 17 October 1878

References
 
 
 
 Biography from the Ministry of Agriculture
 John Henry Pope fonds, Library and Archives Canada 

1824 births
1889 deaths
Canadian businesspeople
Canadian farmers
Conservative Party of Canada (1867–1942) MPs
Canadian Ministers of Railways and Canals
Members of the House of Commons of Canada from Quebec
Members of the King's Privy Council for Canada
Members of the Legislative Assembly of the Province of Canada from Canada East